The 2010 European Korfball Championship was held in the Netherlands from October 22 to 31, with 16 national teams in competition.

The tournament also served as a European qualifier for the 2011 Korfball World Championship, with the top nine nations qualifying for the world championship.

First round
The first round was played in Leeuwarden (A), Tilburg (B), Almelo (C) and The Hague (D).

Second round
Matches were played at Rotterdam.

Quarterfinals

9th to 16th places

Final round

13th-16th places
Matches were played at Topsportcentrum (Rotterdam).

9th-12th places
Matches were played at Topsportcentrum (Rotterdam).

5th-8th places
Matches were played at AHOY sportshall (Rotterdam).

Semifinals
Matches were played at AHOY sportshall (Rotterdam).

Final standing

External links
 Official website
 Results at Worldkorfball.org

European Korfball Championship
2010 in korfball
Korfball in the Netherlands
2010 in Dutch sport
International sports competitions hosted by the Netherlands